Ann E. Todd (born Ann Todd Phillips, later Ann Basart or Ann Phillips Basart; August 26, 1931 – February 7, 2020) was an American child actress. As an adult, she became a music reference librarian at University of California, Berkeley.

Early years
Todd was born in 1931 in Denver, Colorado, to Burrill L. and Alberta C. (née Mayfield) Phillips. She had a younger brother, Stephen (1937–1986).  She was a distant relative of Mary Todd Lincoln.  Due to the privations of the Great Depression, she was raised by her maternal grandparents, Mr. and Mrs. Albert Ulysses Mayfield, her adoptive name was Ann Todd Mayfield. (A Newspaper Enterprise Association story published June 13, 1940, refers to Mrs. A.U. Mayfield as Todd's mother.)

In 1942, Todd was hospitalized in critical condition when blood poisoning developed after she cut her foot playing a game in her backyard.

Film career
Todd made her acting debut in Zaza (1939) directed by George Cukor. In a career spanning over 14 years, she appeared in almost 40 movies alongside such stars as Ingrid Bergman, Shirley Temple, James Stewart, John Garfield, Bette Davis, Barbara Stanwyck and Marlene Dietrich.

Due to the similarities between her name and the established British actress Ann Todd, she added the initial "E." to her name. Todd was a regular in The Stu Erwin Show from 1950 to 1953. She became a teacher and librarian in her later life.

Librarian and academic career
After graduating from the University of California, Los Angeles, she attended the University of California, Berkeley, where she obtained a master's degree in library science in 1958 and a Master of Arts in 1960. She was a reference librarian at U.C. Berkeley from 1960 to 1961 and 1970 to 1990. Among her accomplishments was founding and editing Cum Notis Variorum, the library's newsletter, which gained a substantial reputation. Additionally Basart wrote reviews for the Music Library Association publication Notes as well as serving as its music review editor and book review editor.

She taught at the San Francisco College for Women and at the University of California, Berkeley.

In 1984, Basart established Fallen Leaf Press, publishing reference books in music as well as scores of contemporary American chamber music. Basart closed the business in 2000.

In 1993, she was recognized by the Music Library Association for lifetime achievement.

Filmography

References

External links

 
 

1931 births
2020 deaths
20th-century American actresses
Actresses from Denver
American child actresses
American film actresses
American librarians
American television actresses
American women librarians
Place of death missing
University of California, Berkeley people
21st-century American women